Jacobus "Japie" Basson (25 July 1918 – 8 August 2012) was a South African politician who began his career with the National Party, but was later expelled from it, and became a forceful critic of the apartheid government as a member, by turns, of the United Party, Progressive Federal Party, and his own short-lived National Union. He was described as "fiery", "colourful", an "individualist", and as the "chameleon" of South African politics for his shifting partisan allegiances.

He was originally elected to the House of Assembly in 1950 as MP for the constituency of Namib, in what was then South African-administered South West Africa, before leaving the National Party in 1959. In 1960, he co-founded the South West Party with Ferdinand Lempp, former editor of Allgemeine Zeitung, the German language daily newspaper in the territory.

However, he later founded his own party, the National Union, which despite its opposition to many aspects of the apartheid policies of Hendrik Verwoerd, supported his government's decision to make South Africa a republic, although he declared that a republic would do Verwoerd himself no good.

Basson was elected as MP for Bezuidenhout in Johannesburg in 1961, before merging it with the United Party, for which he served as its foreign affairs spokesman. Following the collapse of that party, Basson led the Committee for a United Opposition, which merged with the more liberal Progressive Reform Party to form the Progressive Federal Party.

In 1980, in the wake of disagreements with the PFP over support for the constitutional reforms of the government of P W Botha, he was expelled from the party caucus. This was because he had stated that he was prepared to serve on the President's Council, a body established by the Botha government  to advise on a new constitution. Earlier, his party had adopted a resolution rejecting the body. He was appointed to the President's Council, serving as a member of its Constitutional Committee from 1981 to 1984, and on retirement from the Council, rejoined the National Party.

References 

1918 births
2012 deaths
South African politicians
People from Paarl
Stellenbosch University alumni